Hapoel Jerusalem Basketball Club, known for sponsorship reasons as Hapoel Bank Yahav Jerusalem (הפועל בנק יהב ירושלים‎), is a professional basketball club based in  the City of Jerusalem, Israel, and competes in the Israeli Basketball Premier League (the top tier of Israeli basketball), the Israeli State Cup, and the Basketball Champions League. It has won several titles, including the ULEB Cup (now called EuroCup) in 2004, the Israeli Basketball Premier League championship in 2015 and 2017, and seven state Cups. In 2013, a new ownership group took over, and the club has since seen a remarkable advancement and expansion. The team began playing in the Pais Arena in 2014.

History

Hapoel Jerusalem Basketball Club was founded in 1935, and incorporated in 1943. It made its first appearance in the Israeli Basketball Premier League in 1955. Hapoel Jerusalem played in the first division most of the 1950s and 1960s, with notable players such as David Kaminsky. The following two decades had ups and downs, as Hapoel Jerusalem toggled between the first and second divisions.

In 1986, led by coach Simi Riger, the team advanced to the Premier League, after five consecutive years in the second division. Since then, Hapoel Jerusalem has remained in the Premier League. In 1996 and 1997, Hapoel Jerusalem won the Israeli Basketball State Cup, defeating Maccabi Tel Aviv in the finals, at the Yad Eliyahu Arena. The team was led by Adi Gordon.

In 2004, Hapoel Jerusalem won its first European title, the ULEB Cup (EuroCup), defeating Real Madrid in the final in Charleroi, Belgium.

In 2005, Israeli-Russian billionaire Arcadi Gaydamak purchased a large stake in the club. As a result, the team became stronger and signed four American players with NBA records – Tamar Slay, Horace Jenkins, Roger Mason, and Mario Austin, as well as  Israeli star Meir Tapiro.

In 2007, Hapoel Jerusalem won its third Israel State Cup, defeating Bnei HaSharon. In early 2008 Hapoel Jerusalem came back from being 22 points down in the 4th quarter, to win its fourth State Cup, beating Maccabi Tel Aviv 93–89. In late 2008 it won its first Israeli Basketball League Cup, beating Ironi Nahariya.

In September 2009, oil tycoon Guma Aguiar became the team's sponsor and helped pay debts left by Gaydamak. On October 8, 2009, Hapoel Jerusalem beat Maccabi Tel Aviv in the Winner Cup finals, winning the club's second cup in a row. One year after the mysterious disappearance of Guma Aguiar, in 2013 a new ownership group headed by entrepreneur Ori Allon took over. Guy Harel succeeded Dani Klein as general manager.

In April 2014, the New York Post and The Wall Street Journal reported that six-time NBA All-Star Amar'e Stoudemire might join Hapoel Jerusalem after his contract with the New York Knicks expired at the end of the 2014–15 NBA season. Stoudemire decided to retire from the NBA in July 2016.

Amar'e Stoudemire signed a two-year contract with Hapoel Jerusalem on August 1, 2016. In his first season with the team he helped it win the Israeli Basketball League Cup, defeating Maccabi Tel Aviv.

On June 20, 2014, the club signed coach Danny Franco. That same day, the club also signed season MVP Donta Smith. On June 25, 2014, the Executive Board of Euroleague Commercial Assets agreed to give Hapoel Jerusalem a wild card to compete for a spot in the EuroLeague qualifications.

On June 25, 2015, Hapoel Jerusalem won the Israeli Basketball Premier League Championship for the first time in their history, defeating Hapoel Eilat in the Final. On June 15, 2017, the club won the Israeli Championship for the second time, defeating Maccabi Haifa in the Israeli Final.

Team management

Ownership
 10% – The Amuta.
 90% – An ownership group, headed by majority owner Ori Allon, including Eyal Chomsky, Shalom Menora, David Kleinhandler and Howard Wietschner.

The new ownership group and corporate management is considered among the most professionally diverse sports ownership groups in the world, as it includes a software developer, who sold two software companies to Google and Twitter (Allon), an American and Israeli real estate and hi-tech businessman (Menora), the CEO of Israel's leading media group (Chomsky), and a retired partner at Goldman Sachs (Wietschner).

Staff

 Head coach: Alexander Dzikic
 Physiotherapists: Gadi Hadad and Yanai Barak
 Team doctor: Dr. Jonathan (Jonty) Maresky
 Orthopedist: Dr. Adi Fridman

Fans and arena

The Brigade
Brigade Malcha is the official ultras organization of Hapoel Jerusalem B.C. In Malha Arena, the Brigade was located behind the south side basket. At the Pais Arena, the Brigade is located in stands #1 and #12. The Brigade has close connections with the team itself, and is consulted by management on instrumental decisions, such as changing the team logo, and planning events with the community.

Rivalry with Maccabi Tel Aviv
Since the founding of the club in 1943, Hapoel Jerusalem has developed a major rivalry with Tel Aviv's leading basketball club Maccabi Tel Aviv. Throughout the years, many games between the two teams became a part of the 'Hall of Fame' of Israeli basketball. The rivalry between the teams is very deep and emotional. Due to its vast size, the Pais Arena has brought Israel's largest basketball rivalry to a whole new level.

Malha Arena (1985–2014)

When Hapoel Jerusalem was founded, it initially played in a small court on Histadrut Street, in the city center, before moving to the Jerusalem International YMCA arena. In the mid-1950s, it moved to the only indoor arena in Jerusalem at that time, "the Straus Arena," in the Histadrut building, on Straus Street. Malha Arena was used as Hapoel Jerusalem's home area from 1985 to 2014. It has a seating capacity of 3,000 seats, with 2,540 seats in its lower tier, an additional 460 seats in its upper tier. With its small size, the arena traps in noise, and distracts the opposing team. This gives a boost to players towards the end of the game when they need it most, according to the former head coach of Hapoel Jerusalem, Oded Kattash.

Pais Arena (2014–present)

Former Mayor of Jerusalem, and Prime Minister of Israel, Ehud Olmert, proposed the master plan for the arena in 2004, and it took ten years to build. Though the Pais Arena is less than two kilometers from the team's previous home, which was opened in 1985, it is exponentially larger. The arena features 11,000 seats, four times as many as in Goldberg Arena, and all the modern amenities expected of a modern basketball venue. The stadium has twelve corporate boxes, each listed for $100,000 per season. The site was chosen far back, but the building only took place in recent years. With an eye towards what the future might bring, the arena has been built to EuroLeague standards. Playing in the EuroLeague in the next few years, is a goal that the team has publicly set for itself. The Pais Arena was opened in the 2014–15 season.

Sponsors
The team's main corporate sponsor is Bank Yahav. Secondary sponsors include Givova, Prima hotels.

Current roster

Depth chart

Notable players

 
  David Kaminsky 7 seasons: '58–'63, '77
  Israel Berlinsky 11 seasons: '59–'70
  Itzhak Neumann 11 seasons: '59–'70
  Yoel Steinberg 13 seasons: '63–'76
  Doron Shefa 10 seasons: '80–'81, '89–'94, '96–'00
   David Blatt 1 season: '86–'87
  Pini Levi 9 seasons: '87–'94, '95–'97
  Erez Hazan 5 seasons: '88–'93
  Emir Mutapčić 2 seasons: '89–'91
  Shalom Turgeman 11 seasons: '89–'96, '97–'01
   Hubert Roberts 4 seasons: '90–'91, '93–'96
  Adi Gordon 6 seasons: '91–'94, '95–'98
  Norris Coleman 3 seasons: '92–'94, '95–'96
  Miki Berkovich 1 season: '93–'94
  Billy Thompson 3 seasons: '94–'97
  Jon Dalzell 3 seasons: '94–'97
  Moti Daniel 2 seasons: '96–'98
   H Waldman 4 seasons: '96–'00
  Radisav Ćurčić 2 seasons: '97–'99
  Kenny Williams 4 seasons: '97–'01
  Derrick Hamilton 2 seasons: '98–'00
  Erez Katz 6 seasons: '98–'04
  Tony Dorsey 1 season: '00–'01
  Haywoode Workman 1 season: '00–'01
  Meir Tapiro 6 seasons: '00–'03, '05–'07, '12–'13
  Demetrius Alexander 1 season: '01–'02
  Moshe Mizrahi 5 seasons: '01–'04, '10–'12
  Andrius Jurkūnas 1 season: '02–'03
  Tunji Awojobi 1 season: '03–'04
  Kelly McCarty 1 season: '03–'04
  Doron Sheffer 2 seasons: '03–'05
  Will Solomon 2 seasons: '03–'04, '10–'11
  Ido Kozikaro 3 seasons: '03–'06
  Yuval Naimy 4 seasons: '03–'04, '09–'12
  William Avery 1 season: '04–'05
  Matan Naor 3 seasons: '04–'07
  Raviv Limonad 3 seasons: '04–'06, '12
  Roger Mason, Jr. 1 season: '05–'06
  Horace Jenkins 2 seasons: '05–'06, '07
  Mario Austin 2 seasons: '05–'07
  Terence Morris 1 season: '06–'07
  Jurica Golemac 1 season: '06–'07
  Dror Hagag 2 seasons: '06–'08
 Erez Markovich 3 seasons: '05–'08
  Guy Pnini 2 seasons: '06–'08
  Timmy Bowers 3 seasons: '06–'09
   Jamie Arnold 1 season: '07–'08
  Ramel Curry 1 season: '07–'08
  Marcus Slaughter 1 season: '07–'08
  Sharon Shason 3 seasons: '07–'10
  Omar Sneed 1 season: '08–'09
  Travis Watson 1 season: '08–'09
  Eugene Jeter 1 season: '09–'10
  Tre Simmons 1 season: '09–'10
  Dijon Thompson 2 seasons: '09–'10, '16–'17
  Yogev Ohayon 4 seasons: '09–'11, '17–'19
  Uri Kokia 4 seasons: '09–'13
  Jason Rich 1 season: '10–'11
  Brian Randle 3 seasons: '10–'12, '17
  D. J. Strawberry 1 season: '11–'12
  Elishay Kadir 2 seasons: '11–'13
  Ramel Bradley 1 season: '11–'12
  Adam Ariel 5 season: '12–'15, '20-'22
  Jacob Pullen 1 season: '12–'13
  Courtney Fells 1 season: '12–'13
  Josh Duncan 3 seasons: '12–'14, '15–'16
  Rafi Menco 4 seasons: '12–'16
  Samardo Samuels 1 season: '13
  Artsiom Parakhouski 1 season: '13–'14
  Derwin Kitchen 2 seasons: '13–'15
  Yotam Halperin 5 seasons: '13–'18
  Lior Eliyahu 6 seasons: '13–'19
  Bracey Wright 1 season: '14–'15
  Tony Gaffney 2 seasons: '14–'16
  Donta Smith 2 seasons: '14–'16
  Bar Timor 7 seasons: '14–'20
   D'Or Fischer 1 season: '15–'16
  E. J. Rowland 1 season: '15–'16
    Amar'e Stoudemire 2 seasons: '16–'17, '18–'19
  Curtis Jerrells 1 season: '16–'17
  Jerome Dyson 2 seasons: '16–'18
  Tarence Kinsey 2 seasons: '16–'18
  James Feldeine 2 seasons: '18–'20
  Tamir Blatt 3 seasons: '18–'21
  TaShawn Thomas 3 seasons: '18–'21
  J'Covan Brown 3 seasons: '18–'21
  Suleiman Braimoh 3 seasons: '19-'22
  John Holland 1 season: '19-'20
  Shelvin Mack 1 season: '20
  Emanuel Terry 1 season: '20
  Deividas Sirvydis 1 season: '20
  Chris Kramer 1 season: '20-'21
  Stanton Kidd 1 season: '21
  Ray McCallum Jr. 1 season: '21
  Jalen Adams 1 season: '21-'22
  Retin Obasohan 1 season: '21-'22
  K. C. Rivers 1 season: '21-'22

Head coaches

 
  Effi Birnbaum
  Pini Gershon
  Zvi Sherf
  Sharon Drucker
  Erez Edelstein
  Dan Shamir
  Guy Goodes 
  Mody Maor
  Oded Kattash
  Danny Franco
  Brad Greenberg
  Simone Pianigiani
  Oren Amiel
  David Kaminsky

Season by season

Italic — Still active.

Logos

Honors
Total titles: 15

Domestic 
Israeli Championships
 Winners (2): 2015, 2017
 Runner-up (7): 1996, 1997, 1999, 2001, 2006, 2007, 2016

State Cup
 Winners (7): 1996, 1997, 2007, 2008, 2019, 2020, 2023
 Runner-up (8): 1999, 2000, 2001, 2002, 2004, 2006, 2015, 2017

League Cup
 Winners (5): 2008, 2009, 2014, 2016, 2019
 Runner-up (3): 2007, 2010, 2013

European 
EuroCup (ULEB Cup)
 Winners (1): 2003–04
 Semifinalist (2): 2005–06, 2016–17
 FIBA Saporta Cup 
 Semifinalist (1): 2001–02
Basketball Champions League
Final 8 (1): 2019–20

References

External links
Official website 
Eurobasket.com team Page
Fan site  

 
Jerusalem
Basketball teams established in 1943
1943 establishments in Mandatory Palestine
Basketball
Israeli Basketball Premier League teams
Jerusalem